The 2007 Chinese motorcycle Grand Prix was the fourth round of the 2007 MotoGP championship. It took place on the weekend of 4–6 May 2007 at the Shanghai International Circuit.

MotoGP classification

250 cc classification

125 cc classification

Championship standings after the race (MotoGP)

Below are the standings for the top five riders and constructors after round four has concluded. 

Riders' Championship standings

Constructors' Championship standings

 Note: Only the top five positions are included for both sets of standings.

References

Chinese motorcycle Grand Prix
Chinese
Motorcycle Grand Prix